This Storm may refer to:

 This Storm (album), an album by Sonya Kitchell
 This Storm (novel), a 2019 novel by James Ellroy